A cementicle is a small, spherical or ovoid calcified mass embedded within or attached to the cementum layer on the root surface of a tooth, or lying free within the periodontal ligament. They tend to occur in elderly individuals.

There are 3 types:
 Free cementicle – not attached to cementum
 Attached (sessile) cementicle – attached to the cementum surface (also termed exocementosis)
 Embedded (interstitial) cementicle – with advancing age the cementum thickens, and the cementicle may become incorporated into the cementum layer

They may be visible on a radiograph (x-ray). They may appear singly or in groups, and are most commonly found at the tip of the root. Their size is variable, but generally they are small (about 0.2 mm – 0.3 mm in diameter). 

Cementicles are usually acellular, and may contain either fibrillar or afibrillar cementum, or a mixture of both. Cementicles are the result of dystrophic calcification, but the reason why this takes place is unclear. Cementicles are thought to form when calcification occurs around a nidus, a precipitating center. Around this nidus they slowly enlarge by further deposition of calcium salts. Examples of how cementicles are thought to form include:
 Calcification due to degenerative changes in the epithelial cell rests of Malassez
 Calcification of thrombosed (blocked) capillaries in the periodontal ligament (i.e. a phlebolith)
 Microtrauma to Sharpey's fibres causes small spicules of cementum or alveolar bone to splinter into the periodontal membrane Some do not consider these as true cementicles.

References

External links 

Periodontal disorders